The Metro Atlantic Athletic Conference Men's Basketball Rookie of the Year is a basketball award given to the Metro Atlantic Athletic Conference's one or more best men's basketball players in their first year of competitive play, as voted on by the coaches in the conference. The award was first given following the 1981–82 season, the first year of the conference's existence, to Tim Cain of Manhattan.

Key

Winners

Winners by school

References

MAAC
Rookie of the Year
Awards established in 1982
1982 establishments in the United States